The Rhode Island Mathematics League (RIML) competition consists of four meets spanning the entire year. It culminates at the state championship held at Bishop Hendricken High School.  Top schools from the state championship are invited to the New England Association of Math Leagues (NEAML) championship.

Format
Each meet consists of five rounds and a team round.  Each team consists of five students, and each school may have as many as six teams.  However, each team may have a maximum of two seniors and four sophomores/juniors.  At least one sophomore or freshman must be on each team (or the team may compete with an empty slot).  Three students from each team participate in a round.  Therefore, each student participates in three rounds and the team round.  The first five rounds consist of three questions each.  Beginning in 2007, one of the five rounds is designated as "calculator-free", in 2008, this number was increased to two, and in 2018, calculators were banned from all meets. The first question in each round is worth one point, the second two points, and the third three points.  Each student works on the questions independently in the ten minutes allotted.  All answers must be presented in simplified and rationalized form unless specified otherwise.  After the completion of the first five rounds, there is a team round.  All five players from each team collaborate on five questions worth two points each.  The maximum score for one team is 100 points, and the maximum score for one student is 18 points.

Rounds
At the first meet the rounds are as follows:

Round 1:  Arithmetic, Number Theory, and Matrices

Round 2:  Algebra I

Round 3:  Geometry

Round 4:  Algebra II

Round 5:  Miscellaneous Math

Team Round

At the second meet the rounds are as follows:

Round 1:  Arithmetic, Number Theory, and Matrices

Round 2:  Algebra I

Round 3:  Geometry

Round 4:  Algebra II

Round 5:  Miscellaneous Math

Team Round

At the third meet the rounds are as follows:

Round 1: Statistics and Probability

Round 2: Algebra I

Round 3: Geometry

Round 4: Algebra II

Round 5: Miscellaneous Math

Team Round

At the fourth meet the rounds are as follows:

Round 1: Statistics and Probability

Round 2: Algebra I

Round 3: Geometry

Round 4: Algebra II

Round 5: Miscellaneous Math

Team Round

At the playoff meet the rounds are as follows:

Round 1: Arithmetic, Number Theory, and Matrices

Round 2: Statistics and Probability

Round 3: Algebra I

Round 4: Geometry

Round 5: Algebra II

Round 6: Miscellaneous Math

At the end of the six rounds, a relay round will occur, where four people from a team of six will participate. In this round, four questions are given, and each student after the first must use the answer given to them from the previous question to answer the next one.

At the end of the relay round, there will be a team round, where four people from the team will compete to answer five questions together.

Miscellaneous Math

As of the 2019-2020 year, certain rounds were replaced with a round called Miscellaneous Math, which tests anything from the first four (or five at the playoff meet) rounds, plus Trigonometry, Analytical Geometry, and Conics.

Calculator Usage

As of the 2018-2019 year, calculators have been prohibited on all rounds, including the team rounds.

Current events

The 2007-08, and 2008-09 league champion was Wheeler School.  Wheeler School ranked third among small schools at the 2006 and 2007 New England championships. In 2009 two seniors from Wheeler, Matthew Halpern and Karan Takhar, tied for first in the state.  Barrington High School ranked first among medium schools at the 2006 New England championships.

Barrington High School won first place for both the normal season and the playoff in the 2017-2018 year.

Wheeler School won first place for both the normal season and the playoff in the 2018-2019 year.

Due to the rise of the COVID-19 pandemic, the playoffs for 2020 were cancelled, and only the four normal meets counted towards school and individual scores. The top three schools were Wheeler School with 340 points, East Greenwich High School with 306 points, and Barrington High School with 292 points. The top three individuals scorers were Wheeler's Eric Tang with a perfect 72 points, The Prout School's Robert Hoffert with 68 points, and Andrew Babb and Jessica Liang from East Greenwich and Barrington, respectively, who tied for third with 65 points. Narragansett High School was dubbed to be the "most improved school" of the year due to having the largest percent change of scores of any school in the state.

Practice Problems 
A link to previous competition problems can be found here.

References 

Mathematics competitions